Cavalcata di mezzo secolo is a 1952 Italian film directed by Luciano Emmer

Cast

External links
 
 Cavalcata di mezzo secolo at Variety Distribution

1952 films
1950s Italian-language films
Italian documentary films
1952 documentary films
Italian black-and-white films
1950s Italian films